The 2008–09 IIHF European Women's Champions Cup was the fifth holding of the IIHF European Women Champions Cup (EWCC). Russian team SKIF Nizhny Novgorod of the Russian Women's Hockey League won the tournament for the first time, ending the four-year championship reign of Swedish team AIK Hockey.

First round

Group A

Group B

Group C

Group D

Second round

Group E

Group F

Super Final

References 
Tournament statistics and data from:
"2009 IIHF European Women Champions Cup: Tournament Reports". webarchive.iihf.com. International Ice Hockey Federation. Retrieved 12 November 2020.
"Coupe d'Europe féminine des clubs champions 2008/09". hockeyarchives.info (in French). Retrieved 12 November 2020.
”EWCC (W) - 2008-2009”. eliteprospects.com. Retrieved 12 November 2020.

External links
 International Ice Hockey Federation

Women
IIHF European Women's Champions Cup
Euro